Smith Corner is a census-designated place in Kern County, California. The population was 524 at the 2010 census.

Demographics
At the 2010 census Smith Corner had a population of 524. The racial makeup of Smith Corner was 227 (43.3%) White, 10 (1.9%) African American, 3 (0.6%) Native American, 2 (0.4%) Asian, 3 (0.6%) Pacific Islander, 263 (50.2%) from other races, and 16 (3.1%) from two or more races. Hispanic or Latino of any race were 440 people (84.0%).

The whole population lived in households, no one lived in non-institutionalized group quarters and no one was institutionalized.

There were 128 households, 74 (57.8%) had children under the age of 18 living in them, 66 (51.6%) were opposite-sex married couples living together, 28 (21.9%) had a female householder with no husband present, 15 (11.7%) had a male householder with no wife present.  There were 23 (18.0%) unmarried opposite-sex partnerships, and 0 (0%) same-sex married couples or partnerships. 9 households (7.0%) were one person and 3 (2.3%) had someone living alone who was 65 or older. The average household size was 4.09.  There were 109 families (85.2% of households); the average family size was 4.12.

The age distribution was 193 people (36.8%) under the age of 18, 82 people (15.6%) aged 18 to 24, 119 people (22.7%) aged 25 to 44, 101 people (19.3%) aged 45 to 64, and 29 people (5.5%) who were 65 or older.  The median age was 23.6 years. For every 100 females, there were 107.9 males.  For every 100 females age 18 and over, there were 112.2 males.

There were 142 housing units at an average density of 646.8 per square mile, of the occupied units 65 (50.8%) were owner-occupied and 63 (49.2%) were rented. The homeowner vacancy rate was 0%; the rental vacancy rate was 4.5%.  264 people (50.4% of the population) lived in owner-occupied housing units and 260 people (49.6%) lived in rental housing units.

References

Census-designated places in Kern County, California
Census-designated places in California